Olaf Roggensack (born 29 May 1997) is a German rower. He competed in the men's eight event at the 2020 Summer Olympics where he won an Olympic silver medal. He has been twice a junior world champion.

Underage representative rowing
Roggensack made his first representative appearance for Germany in a coxless four selected for the 2014 World Junior Rowing Championships. That crew won all three of their races and a world junior title. The next year he rowed in a coxless pair at the 2015 Junior World Championships and was again undefeated in all races and won his second junior world championship title. In 2016 and 2019 he rowed German coxless fours at U23 World Rowing Championships and finished fifth and fourth respectively.  In 2017 and 2018 he was seated in the German U23 men's eight when those crews raced at U23 World Rowing Championships to fifth and then fourth place finishes.

Senior international rowing
In 2020 Roggensack was the only new man added to the well established German senior men's eight - the Deutschlandachter - when he replaced Christopher Reinhardt in the three seat. Roggensack was in the crew for the 2020 European Championship victory and then held his seat for their Tokyo Olympics campaign in 2021.  He rowed in the eight at the 2021 European Championships, two 2021 World Rowing Cups and then at the Tokyo Olympics where they won their heat.  In the Olympic final as favourites they led at the 500m mark but the unfancied New Zealand crew took a lead at the halfway point and couldn't be headed. The German eight with Roggensack in the three seat finished the regatta with an Olympic silver medal.

References

External links
 

1997 births
Living people
German male rowers
Olympic rowers of Germany
Rowers at the 2020 Summer Olympics
Place of birth missing (living people)
Medalists at the 2020 Summer Olympics
Olympic medalists in rowing
Olympic silver medalists for Germany